The lapse rate is the rate at which an atmospheric variable, normally temperature in Earth's atmosphere, falls with altitude. Lapse rate arises from the word lapse, in the sense of a gradual fall.  In dry air, the adiabatic lapse rate is 9.8 °C/km (5.4 °F per 1,000 ft). At Saturated Air Lapse Rate (SALR), where value is 1.1 °C/1000ft - 2.8 °C/1000ft as obtained from ICAO.

It corresponds to the vertical component of the spatial gradient of temperature.
Although this concept is most often applied to the Earth's troposphere, it can be extended to any gravitationally supported parcel of gas.

Definition 
A formal definition from the Glossary of Meteorology is:
The decrease of an atmospheric variable with height, the variable being temperature unless otherwise specified.

Typically, the lapse rate is the negative of the rate of temperature change with altitude change:

where  (sometimes ) is the lapse rate given in units of temperature divided by units of altitude, T is temperature, and z is altitude.

Convection and adiabatic expansion 

The temperature profile of the atmosphere is a result of an interaction between thermal conduction, thermal radiation, and natural convection. Sunlight hits the surface of the earth (land and sea) and heats them. They then heat the air above the surface.

However, when air is hot, it tends to expand, which lowers its density. Thus, hot air tends to rise and carry internal energy upward. This is the process of convection. Vertical convective motion stops when a parcel of air at a given altitude has the same density as the other air at the same elevation.

When a parcel of air expands, it pushes on the air around it, doing thermodynamic work. An expansion or contraction of an air parcel without inward or outward heat transfer is an adiabatic process. Air has low thermal conductivity, and the bodies of air involved are very large, so transfer of heat by conduction is negligibly small. Also, in such expansion and contraction, intra-atmospheric radiative heat transfer is relatively slow and so negligible. Since the upward-moving and expanding parcel does work but gains no heat, it loses internal energy so that its temperature decreases.

The adiabatic process for air has a characteristic temperature-pressure curve, so the process determines the lapse rate. The reverse occurs for a sinking parcel of air.

When the lapse rate is less than the adiabatic lapse rate the atmosphere is stable and convection will not occur.

However, some exceptionally energetic convection processes, such as volcanic eruption columns and overshooting tops associated with severe supercell thunderstorms, may locally and temporarily inject convection through the tropopause and into the stratosphere.

Energy transport in the atmosphere is more complex than the interaction between radiation and convection. Thermal conduction, evaporation, condensation, precipitation all influence the temperature profile, as described below.

Mathematics of the adiabatic lapse rate
These calculations use a very simple model of an atmosphere, either dry or moist, within a still vertical column at equilibrium.

Dry adiabatic lapse rate
Thermodynamics defines an adiabatic process as:

the first law of thermodynamics can be written as

where  is the specific heat at constant pressure.

Assuming an atmosphere in hydrostatic equilibrium:

where g is the standard gravity. Combining these two equations to eliminate the pressure, one arrives at the result for the dry adiabatic lapse rate (DALR),

Moist adiabatic lapse rate  

The presence of water within the atmosphere (usually the troposphere) complicates the process of convection. Water vapor contains latent heat of vaporization. As a parcel of air rises and cools, it eventually becomes saturated; that is, the vapor pressure of water in equilibrium with liquid water has decreased (as temperature has decreased) to the point where it is equal to the actual vapor pressure of water. With further decrease in temperature the water vapor in excess of the equilibrium amount condenses, forming cloud, and releasing heat (latent heat of condensation). Before saturation, the rising air follows the dry adiabatic lapse rate. After saturation, the rising air follows the moist (or wet) adiabatic lapse rate. The release of latent heat is an important source of energy in the development of thunderstorms.

While the dry adiabatic lapse rate is a constant  ( per 1,000 ft), the moist adiabatic lapse rate varies strongly with temperature. A typical value is around ,. The formula for the moist adiabatic lapse rate is given by:

where:
{| border="0" cellpadding="2"
|-
| style="text-align:right;" | ,
| wet adiabatic lapse rate, K/m
|-
| style="text-align:right;" | ,
| Earth's gravitational acceleration = 9.8076 m/s2
|-
| style="text-align:right;" | ,
| heat of vaporization of water =  
|-
| style="text-align:right;" | ,
| specific gas constant of dry air = 287 J/kg·K 
|-
| style="text-align:right;" | ,
| specific gas constant of water vapour = 461.5 J/kg·K
|-
| style="text-align:right;" | ,
| the dimensionless ratio of the specific gas constant of dry air to the specific gas constant for water vapour = 0.622
|-
| style="text-align:right;" | ,
| the water vapour pressure of the saturated air
|-
| style="text-align:right;" | ,
| the mixing ratio of the mass of water vapour to the mass of dry air
|-
| style="text-align:right;" | ,
| the pressure of the saturated air
|-
|-
| style="text-align:right;" | ,
| temperature of the saturated air, K
|-
| style="text-align:right;" | ,
| the specific heat of dry air at constant pressure, = 1003.5J/kg·K 
|}

Environmental lapse rate 
The environmental lapse rate (ELR), is the rate of decrease of temperature with altitude in the stationary atmosphere at a given time and location. The standard atmosphere contains no moisture. Unlike the idealized ISA, the temperature of the actual atmosphere does not always fall at a uniform rate with height. For example, there can be an inversion layer in which the temperature increases with altitude.

Effect on weather 

The varying environmental lapse rates throughout the Earth's atmosphere are of critical importance in meteorology, particularly within the troposphere. They are used to determine if the parcel of rising air will rise high enough for its water to condense to form clouds, and, having formed clouds, whether the air will continue to rise and form bigger shower clouds, and whether these clouds will get even bigger and form cumulonimbus clouds (thunder clouds).

As unsaturated air rises, its temperature drops at the dry adiabatic rate. If unsaturated air rises far enough, eventually its temperature will reach its dew point, and condensation will begin to form. This altitude is known as the lifting condensation level (LCL) when mechanical lift is present and the convective condensation level (CCL) when mechanical lift is absent, in which case, the parcel must be heated from below to its convective temperature. The cloud base will be somewhere within the layer bounded by these parameters.

Given a difference in temperature and dew point readings on the ground, one can easily find the LCL by multiplying the difference by 222 m/°C.

If the environmental lapse rate is less than the moist adiabatic lapse rate, the air is absolutely stable — rising air will cool faster than the surrounding air and lose buoyancy. This often happens in the early morning, when the air near the ground has cooled overnight. Cloud formation in stable air is unlikely.

If the environmental lapse rate is between the moist and dry adiabatic lapse rates, the air is conditionally unstable — an unsaturated parcel of air does not have sufficient buoyancy to rise to the LCL or CCL, and it is stable to weak vertical displacements in either direction. If the parcel is saturated it is unstable and will rise to the LCL or CCL, and either be halted due to an inversion layer of convective inhibition, or if lifting continues, deep, moist convection (DMC) may ensue, as a parcel rises to the level of free convection (LFC), after which it enters the free convective layer (FCL) and usually rises to the equilibrium level (EL).

If the environmental lapse rate is larger than the dry adiabatic lapse rate, it has a superadiabatic lapse rate, the air is absolutely unstable — a parcel of air will gain buoyancy as it rises both below and above the lifting condensation level or convective condensation level. This often happens in the afternoon mainly over land masses. In these conditions, the likelihood of cumulus clouds, showers or even thunderstorms is increased.

Meteorologists use radiosondes to measure the environmental lapse rate and compare it to the predicted adiabatic lapse rate to forecast the likelihood that air will rise. Charts of the environmental lapse rate are known as thermodynamic diagrams, examples of which include Skew-T log-P diagrams and tephigrams. (See also Thermals).

The difference in moist adiabatic lapse rate and the dry rate is the cause of foehn wind phenomenon (also known as "Chinook winds" in parts of North America). The phenomenon exists because warm moist air rises through orographic lifting up and over the top of a mountain range or large mountain. The temperature decreases with the dry adiabatic lapse rate, until it hits the dew point, where water vapor in the air begins to condense. Above that altitude, the adiabatic lapse rate decreases to the moist adiabatic lapse rate as the air continues to rise. Condensation is also commonly followed by precipitation on the top and windward sides of the mountain. As the air descends on the leeward side, it is warmed by adiabatic compression at the dry adiabatic lapse rate. Thus, the foehn wind at a certain altitude is warmer than the corresponding altitude on the windward side of the mountain range. In addition, because the air has lost much of its original water vapor content, the descending air creates an arid region on the leeward side of the mountain.

See also 
 Adiabatic process
 Atmospheric thermodynamics
 Fluid dynamics
 Foehn wind
 Lapse rate climate feedback
 Scale height

Notes

References

Further reading 
  www.air-dispersion.com

External links 
 Definition, equations and tables of lapse rate from the Planetary Data system.
 National Science Digital Library glossary:
 Lapse Rate
 Environmental lapse rate
 Absolute stable air
 An introduction to lapse rate calculation from first principles from U. Texas

Atmospheric thermodynamics
Climate change feedbacks
Fluid mechanics
Spatial gradient
Atmospheric temperature
Vertical position